The Memphis Open was a golf tournament on the LPGA Tour from 1959 to 1960. It was played at the Ridgeway Country Club in Memphis, Tennessee.

Winners
1960 Mickey Wright
1959 Marilynn Smith

References

Former LPGA Tour events
Golf in Tennessee
Sports in Memphis, Tennessee
1959 establishments in Tennessee
1960 disestablishments in Tennessee
History of women in Tennessee